Kalenberg is a hamlet in the northeastern Netherlands. It is located in the municipality Hoogeveen, Drenthe, about 4 km northwest of the town of Hogeveen.

It was first mentioned in 1846 as Kalenberg, and means "bare hill". It is not a statistical entity, and the postal authorities have placed it under Fluitenberg. It consists of about 7 houses. Since 2007, it is home to a vineyard.

References

Populated places in Drenthe
Hoogeveen